Warren Historic District or Warren Commercial Historic District may refer to:

in the United States (by state)
 Warren Commercial Historic District (Warren, Illinois), listed on the NRHP in Jo Daviess County, Illinois
 Warren-Prentis Historic District, Detroit, Michigan, listed on the NRHP
 Warren Commercial Historic District (Warren, Ohio), listed on the NRHP in Trumbull County, Ohio
 Warren Historic District (Warren, Pennsylvania), listed on the NRHP in Pennsylvania
 Warren Waterfront Historic District, Warren, Rhode Island, listed on the NRHP in Rhode Island
 Warren Village Historic District, Warren, Vermont, listed on the NRHP in Washington County, Vermont
 Andrew Warren Historic District, Wausau, Wisconsin, listed on the NRHP in Wisconsin

See also 
 Warrenton Historic District (disambiguation)